Beren Saat (born 26 February 1984) is a Turkish actress. Since the beginning of her career, she has received critical acclaim and numerous accolades for her acting. While studying at Başkent University, she participated in the acting competition Türkiye'nin Yıldızları and was discovered by Turkish director Tomris Giritlioğlu, launching her professional acting career.

Beren Saat made her acting debut with a minor part in the television series Aşkımızda Ölüm Var (2004). She was then prepared by Tomris Giritlioğlu for her first major role in Aşka Sürgün (2005–2006). She starred as a feisty tomboy named Yasemin Ünsal in the ATV's political series Hatırla Sevgili (2006–2008) and came to international attention for her role as Bihter Yöreoğlu Ziyagil, an unfaithful wife, in the Kanal D's romantic series Aşk-ı Memnu (2008–2010), for which she received critical acclaim and won numerous accolades, including two Golden Butterfly Awards. Her other major roles in television includes a rape victim, Fatmagül Ketenci Ilgaz, in the social drama Fatmagül'ün Suçu Ne? (2010–2012), and an avenger named Derin Çelik/Yağmur Özden in the drama series İntikam (2013–2014), a remake from the American television series Revenge. Her film career began with the drama film Güz Sancısı (2009), and continued with Gecenin Kanatları (2009), Rhino Season (2012) and Benim Dünyam (2013). From 2015 to 2016, she starred as the titular character in the historical drama series Muhteşem Yüzyıl: Kösem, for which she was said to be receiving 90,000 per episode. Between 2019 and 2021, Saat had the leading role on the Netflix original series The Gift.

Saat was the highest-paid actress in Turkey from 2008 to 2014. She has participated in several movies as a voice actor. She was named Actress of the Year in the "2010 Damgasını Vuranlar" list published by Radikal newspaper. In addition to her acting career, Saat is noted for her charitable efforts. She has been married to singer Kenan Doğulu since 2014.

Early life
Beren Saat was born on 26 February 1984 in Ankara, to Ayla Saat (née Dikmen) and Hüseyin Avni Saat, both graduates of sports academy. She has a brother, Cem Saat. Raised in Ankara, she primarily studied at TED Ankara College Foundation Private High School and briefly attended Başkent University's Faculty of Economic and Administrative Sciences before pursuing a career in acting. With the support of her college friends, she applied to an acting competition called Türkiye'nin Yıldızları in which she became the first runner-up. After that, she appeared on TV commercials of Tofita directed by Sinan Çetin. She was discovered by the renowned director Tomris Giritlioğlu and debuted in her first series Aşkımızda Ölüm Var.

Career

2004–08: Hatırla Sevgili and Aşk-ı Memnu
In 2004, she was cast as Nermin in the TV series Aşkımızda Ölüm Var, directed by Nazif Tunç and Ümit Efekan. Her character was the sister of Ece Uslu's character in the series. In 2005, she starred as the female lead Zilan Şahvar Azizoğlu in Aşka Sürgün which was produced by Tomris Giritlioğlu and directed by Cemal Şan. Her co-star in this series was Mahsun Kırmızıgül. In 2006, she was cast as Yasemin Ünsal in the popular series Hatırla Sevgili directed by Faruk Teber and Ümmü Burha. She shared the leading role with Cansel Elçin and Okan Yalabık. The series focused on the political events occurred during 1950–70 and Saat achieved great success and nationwide fame during the period of its broadcast. Saat's friend and co-star Cansel Elçin gave an interview in which he described Beren Saat as a "super artist of high quality". In 2007, Saat appeared as a guest actress on episode 121 of the series Avrupa Yakası.

Later in 2008, she was cast in a leading role as Bihter Yöreoğlu Ziyagil in Aşk-ı Memnu (Forbidden Love), a romantic drama series which was adapted from author Halid Ziya Uşaklıgil's novel of the same name. The series was directed by Hilal Saral. Saat shared the leading role with Kıvanç Tatlıtuğ, Selçuk Yöntem and Nebahat Çehre. The story is about a girl, Bihter Yöreoğlu Ziyagil, who falls in a forbidden love with her husband's young nephew, Behlül (portrayed by Kıvanç Tatlıtuğ). Aşk-ı Memnu received positive response from the audience and was the most watched TV series in the history of Turkish television productions. Three out of every four people in Turkey watched the final episode titled "Veda". Beren Saat received critical acclaim by the critics for her performance in the final episode and the suicide scene of Bihter broke viewing records. Turkish film actress Selda Alkor commented on the final performance of Saat saying: "I congratulate Beren Saat. She really played great. She portrayed the character's psychology so great that I believe she'll become one of the most important actresses of the industry like one of us". The series became one of the most common complaints during its broadcast and some of these complaints were issued by RTÜK from time to time and were rebuffed by some ministers. After the show was broadcast around the world, Saat rose to international prominence specially in the Middle East and Europe. On 24 June 2010, the final episode aired which featured Bihter's death and the following year on the character's death anniversary people shared messages mourning her decease. The series also reached great popularity in Egypt and a TV channel made a documentary about Beren Saat's life. Hamdi Alkan, a member of Türkiye'nin Yıldızları jury was interviewed and detailed information about Beren Saat. At the end of 2010, Media Monitoring Center after a research announced that Saat has been one of the most popular TV series actors and the most talked actress of the year. She was named as Actress of the Year in the "2010 Damgasını Vuranlar" list published by Radikal newspaper.

In an interview, she stated that "I've learned a lot from what the writers wrote about the mentality of Bihter". For her role in the series, she won two Golden Butterfly Awards, and was the first nominee to win the award for two consecutive years. After the series' conclusion, the scenario was sold to Italy in 2010 and to the United States in 2012 for making adaptations in these two countries.

2009–12: Cinema movies and Fatmagül'ün Suçu Ne?
Güz Sancısı (Pains of Autumn) was her first feature film experience, a period film directed by Tomris Giritlioğlu. Co-starred with Murat Yıldırım, Okan Yalabık and Belçim Bilgin, Saat portrayed the Greek prostitute Elena. In 2009, she also acted in Serdar Akar's film Gecenin Kanatları (Wings of the Night), written by Mahsun Kırmızıgül. She shared the lead role with Murat Ünalmış, Erkan Petekkaya and Yavuz Bingöl. She played the character Gece. There was a long discussion over a sex scene involving Saat and her co-star Murat Ünalmış on whether to show it or not and later the images of this scene was shown in the film's trailer which resulted in Saat's extreme backlash. She didn't attend the film's premiere and later sued the producer. In 2013, she withdrew the case against the producer. In 2010, she dubbed the voice of Barbie in the Turkish version of high-grossing animation Toy Story 3. In the summer of 2010, she became the face of the chips brand Patos for which she participated in numerous commercials and advertisements. Thereafter, the sales of Patos chips increased by 45% . In the same year, Saat became the face of advertisements for Rexona.

In 2010, Saat acted in the series Fatmagül'ün Suçu Ne? a screenplay adaptation of the movie written by Vedat Türkali in 1986. The series was directed by Hilal Saral and written by Ece Yörenç and Melek Gençoğlu. Her role Fatmagül Ketenci Ilgaz portrayed a victim of rape. Saat's principal partner in this series was her friend from Türkiye'nin Yıldızları competition, Engin Akyürek. The other main actors were Sumru Yavrucuk, Musa Uzunlar, Serdar Gökhan and Deniz Türkali. One of the most discussed scenes in this series was the dramatic rape scene in the first episode which broke the rating records. The series was well received by the audience and was among the top-rated series of the recent years. Saat received psychological support for this role together with some friends before playing the rape scene. The series was later contained among the items of the parliament's agenda because of its sexual scenes and a campaign was launched to stop the series' broadcast. A written statement was issued by several deputies of the Bundesrat of Germany supporting the series because of its emphasis on women's rights. After the series was broadcast in numerous countries around the world, Saat's face began to appear on the covers of magazines in different countries. After her portrayal of Fatmagül, a website published a video game on internet and converted her into one of its characters. During the game Saat could get dresses from a wardrobe that contained items such as clothes, shoes, wigs, etc. It was one of the most played games at the time of its publication. For her role in this series she was nominated for an Antalya Television Award in the Best Drama Series Actress category.

In 2012, Saat acted in her third film Rhino Season directed by the Iranian director Bahman Ghobadi. She was cast as Monica Bellucci's daughter Buse. Yılmaz Erdoğan, Caner Cindoruk and Belçim Bilgin were among the Turkish actors and Behrouz Vossoughi and Arash were among the Iranian actors that starred in this movie. The world premiere of the film was held at the Toronto International Film Festival. In September of the same year, the animation Brave was released in Turkey. Saat dubbed the voice of Merida in the film's Turkish version.

2013–2016: İntikam, Benim Dünyam and Muhteşem Yüzyıl: Kösem
At the end of 2012, Saat began filming the series İntikam which is based on the original American series Revenge. She continued her TV career after six months of absence with İntikam. She took private lessons to improve her fighting ability for the role. The starring cast included Mert Fırat, Yiğit Özşener, Zafer Algöz, Arzu Gamze Kılınç and Engin Hepileri. The show premiered in January 2013 and Saat portrayed the character Derin Çelik/Yağmur Özden. Her dressing style was one of the most talked topics beside her acting performance. In the summer of 2013, Saat took the leading role in the movie Benim Dünyam, an adaptation from 2005 Indian movie Black. Saat shared the leading role with Uğur Yücel and played the character Ela Bayındır. Other co-stars included Ayça Bingöl, Turgay Kantürk and Hazar Ergüçlü as well as the child actress Melis Mutluç. She portrayed a blind, deaf and dumb character. After her role in this film, an American website named Beren Saat as one of the "stars" in the world and said the characters that were shown in the adapted movie were portrayed better than the original one. Also in 2013, she became the face of "Duru Perfume Duş Jeli" brand and was featured in an advertising film that took two days to shoot.

In 2014, it was announced that Muhteşem Yüzyıl: Kösem would begin in September 2015 and Saat was among the candidates to portray the leading role Kösem Sultan. The other actresses that were supposed to take the leading role included Bergüzar Korel, Tuba Büyüküstün and Hazal Kaya. The show's producer Timur Savcı refuted these allegations and said that the person who was chosen to portray Kösem Sultan would remain unrecognized. But in June 2015, it was announced that Saat would portray Kösem Sultan in this new TV series. She entered the series from episode 7 and left it after finishing season 1. Her co-stars included Hülya Avşar, Mete Horozoğlu and Erkan Kolçak Köstendil. In July 2015, together with her husband, she appeared in an advertising film for Arçelik. The advertisement begins with an action scene by Saat, while Doğulu is singing a song at the same time. The commercial also shows her while she's on a film set receiving an award in an event and in her home with Kenan Doğulu. In July 2015, she dubbed the voice of Scarlet Overkill in the Turkish version of Minions. In September 2015, the film was released in Turkey and Kenan Doğulu also dubbed the voice of Scarlet Overkill's inventor husband, Herb Overkill.

2019–present: The Gift
Between 2019 and 2021, Saat starred in the Netflix original series The Gift, in which she portrayed the lead role Atiye, an artist who comes across universal secrets in Anatolia. It premiered on 27 December 2019. The series was included on BBC's list of 10 most recommended series for December 2019.  Writing for Hürriyet, Onur Baştürk mentioned that there was "no trace of the childishness or disharmony" that he had seen in The Protector, and praised the performance of all the actors, including Saat and her co-star Mehmet Günsür. The love scenes in the TV series became subject of discussion on social media and drew mixed reactions. Its second season was released in September 2020, followed by a third and final season in June 2021.

Personal life
Beren Saat began dating Kenan Doğulu in February 2012. Saat and Doğulu became engaged on 23 February 2014 in Istanbul and were married on 29 July 2014 in a private ceremony in Los Angeles, California in the United States.

Philanthropy
Saat has participated in many social projects. In 2011, she became the face of deodorant brand Rexona and donated all 100.000 that she had earned to "Mor Çatı", a women's shelter foundation. In 2012, she designed some T-shirts for Elle magazine with her face on their covers and most of the money that was earned from selling the T-shirts in NetWork stores was donated to Nar Taneleri Projesi ("Pomegranate Seeds Project"), a charity which educates young orphan girls aged between 18 and 24. In December of the same year, she appeared on a calendar that was made and designed by Trendus.com, with a girl suffering from leukemia with Snow White costume on its cover. The Money that was earned by selling these calendars was donated to "Health and Education Foundation for Children with Leukemia". Saat, later went in front of the camera for a video supporting a project organized by European Union and Afghanistan's Ministry of Health for women's healthy childbirth in Afghanistan.

In September 2014, Saat vocalized in "Baba Beni Okula Gönder" (Daddy Send Me to School) campaign's advertising film directed by Ozan Açıktan. In the "Breast Cancer Awareness Month" in October 2014, she appeared in Abdi İpekçi Arena and performed a symbolic jump ball with a pink ball during EuroLeague basketball competition. In the same month, Saat along with many other celebrities participated in "Gençliğe Hitabe" program for addressing young people with hearing disabilities using sign language. She was also one of the first people who reacted to the murder of Özgecan Aslan by publishing messages in her social media accounts. The messages contained information about her own experiences of challenges and difficulties of women in Turkey.

Filmography

Awards and nominations

References

External links
 
 

1984 births
Living people
Actresses from Ankara
Turkish film actresses
Turkish television actresses
TED Ankara College Foundation Schools alumni
21st-century Turkish actresses
Golden Butterfly Award winners